The World Esperanto Congress (UK) is an annual Esperanto convention. It has the longest tradition among international Esperanto conventions, with an almost unbroken run for 113 years. The congresses have been held since 1905 every year, except during World War I, World War II, and the COVID-19 pandemic. Since the 1920s, the Universal Esperanto Association has been organizing these congresses.

These congresses take place every year and, over the 30 years from 1985 through 2014, have gathered an average of about 2,000 participants (since World War II it has varied from 800 to 6,000, depending on the venue). The average number of countries represented is about 60. Some specialized organizations also gather a few hundred participants in their annual meetings. The World Congress usually takes place in the last week of July or first week of August, beginning and ending on a Saturday (8 days in total). For many years ILERA has operated an amateur radio station during the conventions.

Until 1980, meetings were held in Europe and the United States, with the exception of Japan in 1965. Since then, other countries have been Brazil, Canada, China, Cuba, South Korea, Australia, Israel, Vietnam and Argentina.

History

Statistics

Countries
Countries by number of times as host:

Continents
Of the 102 congresses that have happened so far, 84 were hosted in Europe, 8 in Asia, 6 in North America, 3 in South America, 1 in Australia/Oceania and none in Africa.

Cities
Cities by number of times as host:

The remaining cities hosted the event only once.

See also 
 Language festival

Notes

References

External links 
 
 
 Photos of the World Congresses in the Bildarchiv Austria

Esperanto meetings
Recurring events established in 1905
1905 establishments in France
Esperanto in France